Bethlehem was a Christian country rock band in the 1970s, during the Jesus Music era, before the rise of the contemporary Christian music industry. The group released one self-titled album in 1978 under the Maranatha! label. The group's sound has drawn comparison with general market bands such as Poco & The Eagles.

Band members were:
Danny Daniels acoustic & electric guitars, lead & backing vocals
Dom Franco Pedal Steel guitar, dobro, vocals
Randy Rigby lead electric guitar, keyboards, vocals
John Falcone bass guitar, vocals
Dan McCleery drums, percussion, vocals

They were connected with the Jesus movement revival, particularly that in southern California centered on Calvary Chapel, Costa Mesa, CA.

It was Recorded during March & April 1978 at North Star Studios, Boulder, Colorado; Buddy King Studio, Huntington Beach, CA; Sound Castle Studio, Hollywood, CA; & Maranatha! Studio, Santa Ana, CA;
Engineered by Peter Gregg, Jonathan Brown & Al Perkins; Mixed by Jonathan Brown & Al Perkins; Mastered by Bob Carbone @ A & M Records;

References

External links 
 http://musicmoz.org/Bands_and_Artists/B/Bethlehem/Discography/Bethlehem/
 http://one-way.org/jesusmusic/index.html (choose the group "Bethlehem")
 Powell, Mark Allan. "Bethlehem" in The Encyclopedia of American Gospel Music google books, p. 35; https://books.google.com/books?id=uqT-CJYcqskC&pg=PA35&lpg=PA35&dq=Bethlehem+(Danny+Daniels)&source=bl&ots=jiwR-PKNK1&sig=V8wtm8_bD01xIbeIZ5DjYOkQEHc&hl=en&ei=WF5yS8QPgvCyA9Xt8aYF&sa=X&oi=book_result&ct=result&resnum=5&ved=0CBYQ6AEwBA#v=onepage&q=Bethlehem%20(Danny%20Daniels)&f=true
 http://www.danny-daniels.com/home.html

American Christian musical groups
Musical groups established in the 1970s